Baruq (also Romanized as Bārūq) is a village in Baruq Rural District of the Central District of Heris County, East Azerbaijan province, Iran. At the 2006 National Census, its population was 1,070 in 273 households. The following census in 2011 counted 998 people in 302 households. The latest census in 2016 showed a population of 913 people in 293 households; it was the largest village in its rural district.

References 

Heris County

Populated places in East Azerbaijan Province

Populated places in Heris County